Cereus haitiensis is a name in the cactus genus Cereus for a plant now considered a form of Selenicereus grandiflorus. It is not to be confused with Cereus ayisyen, which was originally published under the same name in 2017.

References

haitiensis
Historically recognized angiosperm taxa
Plants described in 1926